The following lists events that happened during 2007 in the Republic of Guinea.

Events

January
 January 10 - A general strike starts in Guinea, with trade unions calling for pay rises, the return to jail of Mamadou Sylla and the resignation of President Lansana Conté.

February
 February 22 - President Lansana Conté appoints Lansana Kouyaté as the new Prime Minister of Guinea after reaching an agreement with the trade union movement and the Opposition.

March
 March 28 - Lansana Conté names a new government led by Lansana Kouyaté.

References

 
2000s in Guinea
Years of the 21st century in Guinea
Guinea
Guinea